Murder with Music is a 1948  American race film directed by George P. Quigley. The film used footage from the 1946 film Mistaken Identity and musical footage was reused in the short subject Bob Howard's House Party. Alfred N. Sack "presented" the film.

Plot 
In a story told in flashbacks, a musician performing at a club is killed by a thrown knife. A sexy singer, a reporter, and an escaped convict have roles in the intrigue.

Cast 
Bob Howard as Editor
Milton Williams as Ted
Nellie Hill as Lola
Bill Dillard as Mike
George Oliver as Hal 
Marjorie Oliver as Secretary
Ruth Cobbs as Mary Smith
Ken Renard as Bill Smith
Andrew Maize as Jerry the Cop
Pinky Williams as Lewis
Skippy Williams as Band leader
Alston as Dancer
Johnson as Specialty dancer
Noble Sissle as Themselves
Young as Dancer
Ken Renard

Soundtrack 
 "Geeshee" (Written by Sidney Easton and Augustus Smith)
 Bob Howard, accompanied by Noble Sissle and his Orchestra - "Too Late Baby" (Written by Sidney Easton and Augustus Smith)
 Noble Sissle, accompanied by his orchestra - "Hello Happiness" (Written by Sidney Easton and Augustus Smith)
 Skippy Williams and his band - "Jam Session" (Written by Skippy Williams)
 Noble Sissle and by his orchestra - "Running Around" (Written by Sidney Easton and Augustus Smith)
 Nellie Hill - "Can't Help It" (Written by Skippy Williams)
 Nellie Hill accompanied by Skippy Williams and his band - "Can't Help It" (reprise)
 Played on piano and danced by Johnson and Johnson - "That's the Cheese You Got To Squeeze"

Reviews
John Howard Reid gave a highly unfavorable account of the movie's direction and editing.

References

External links 

1948 films
1948 drama films
1948 musical films
American black-and-white films
American drama films
American crime films
Race films
1940s English-language films
1940s American films